The Sunderland International Airshow was the biggest free annual airshow in Europe, held at the Roker and Seaburn seafronts. It takes place over the course of three days, usually the final weekend in July (Friday to Sunday), and attracts around 2,000,000 spectators every year. The airshow features a large number of planes, including the Red Arrows and the Eurofighter Typhoon. In addition to the planes, the seafront plays host to a range of food counters, stalls and fairground games. The Royal Navy traditionally have a warship off the coast every year, usually , the adopted warship of Sunderland, however in 2007,  made an appearance instead as HMS Ocean had other commitments. The airshow was first held in 1989 as a single day show, and was planned to be a one-off event, when it attracted 250,000 spectators. Due to its success, from 1991 it became a two-day show, and subsequently three days. Due to thick fog and mist in 2008 the airshow was cancelled. The display was also postponed in 2020 and 2021 because of the COVID-19 pandemic.

Some aviation fans stayed the whole weekend. The Friday night launch, which started back in 2010, shows sunset displays for the majority of the night, but the night is rounded off with gliders with sparklers (used in fireworks) during the "settling down" period, and then a large firework display ends it all.

Sunderland City Council announced in October 2022 that it has "no plans" to hold the airshow again, after officially cancelling the 2023 airshow, citing the "global climate emergency" and the city’s desire to be carbon neutral by 2040, despite owning nearly 10% in the nearby Newcastle International Airport.

Affiliations
Newcastle International Airport was used as the main base for the displaying aircraft up until 2007 and again from 2014 as Teesside International Airport (the interim base for all but the more prestigious displaying aircraft 2007–14) was going into decline, and as well it seemed right to depart from Newcastle Airport, as they are an official sponsor of the event.

The Green Airshow
In 2007 Sunderland City Council teamed up with Gentoo and CarbonNeutral North East to reduce and offset all the emissions caused by staging the two-day show.
There was a Green Village with many environmental stalls.

Highlights

The show has had many highlights over the years, including:
Red Arrows
Eurofighter Typhoon
Black Cats (Royal Navy)
Harrier GR9
The Blades (aerobatic team)
F-16
The Battle of Britain Memorial Flight
The RAF Falcons
Royal Marines Role Demo – 6 Assault Squadron
RAF Chinook Display Team – Personnel from 18 and 27 Squadrons
Eastern Airways BAe Jetstream 41 North East England Livery
Catalina

Gallery

References

External links

Official Website
Official Facebook page for Sunderland International Airshow
YouTube: Highlights from Sunderland International Airshow 2012
Sunderland Live organises the Sunderland International Airshow on behalf of Sunderland City Council

Airshows in the United Kingdom
Tourist attractions in the City of Sunderland
Annual events in England
1988 establishments in England
2022 disestablishments in England
Recurring events established in 1988
Events in Tyne and Wear
Sunderland